Patrick Brannan (born 4 March 1981), better known as Donny Tourette, is an English singer and songwriter. He is best known for his work with the punk band Towers of London.

Early life
Patrick Brannan was born in Liverpool on 4 March 1981, and grew up in Buckinghamshire.

Career
He appeared in the 2007 edition of Celebrity Big Brother. He was the eighth Celebrity Big Brother 2007 contestant to enter the UK Big Brother House on 3 January 2007, but escaped over the wall on day 3.

On 7 February 2007, Tourette appeared as a contestant on pop quiz game show Never Mind the Buzzcocks (Series 20, Episode 2).

Personal life
Tourette had an on-off relationship with Peaches Geldof.

References

External links
 
 
 

English songwriters
English male singers
Living people
Singers from London
1981 births
English punk rock singers
21st-century English singers
21st-century British male singers
British male songwriters